Love Around the House (French: L'amour autour de la maison) is a 1947 French-Belgian drama film directed by Pierre de Hérain and starring Pierre Brasseur, María Casares and Julien Carette. It was shot at the Billancourt Studios in Paris and on location around Finistère. The film's sets were designed by the art director Alexandre Arnstam.

Synopsis
Two sisters live in an isolated house in the countryside of Brittany where the lonely life leads to jealousy and ultimately a death.

Cast
 Pierre Brasseur as 	Douze Apôtres - le braconnier
 María Casares as 	Thérèse
 Claude Larue as Nicole	
 Julien Carette as 	Le père Jus 
 Serge Andréguy as 	Bernard
 Jean Crédoz as 	Le garde	
 Paul Faivre as 	Albert		
 Micheline Gilbert as 	Paulette
 Jean Heuzé as 	Norière
 Palmyre Levasseur as Madame Le Moal
 Robert Lussac as 	Le docteur Coulon
 Jane Marken as Madame Jobic	
 Denyse Réal as 	Rachel 
 Madeleine Suffel as 	Léontine

References

Bibliography 
 Thys, Marianne. Belgian Cinema. Royal Belgian Film Archive, 1999.

External links 
 

1947 films
French drama films
Belgian drama films
1947 drama films
1940s French-language films
Films based on Belgian novels
Films directed by Pierre de Hérain
Films shot at Billancourt Studios
Films shot in France
Films set in Brittany
French-language Belgian films
1940s French films